Vĩnh Trung may refer to several places in Vietnam, including:

Vĩnh Trung, Đà Nẵng, a ward of Thanh Khê District
Vĩnh Trung, Quảng Ninh, a commune of Móng Cái
Vĩnh Trung, Khánh Hòa, a commune of Nha Trang
Vĩnh Trung, An Giang, a commune of Tịnh Biên District
Vĩnh Trung, Hậu Giang, a commune of Vị Thủy District
Vĩnh Trung, Quảng Trị, a commune of Vĩnh Linh District